The 2019–20 Serie C was the sixth season of the unified Serie C division, the third tier of the Italian football league system. The season was scheduled to run from 24 August 2019 to 26 April 2020, however, on 9 March 2020, the Italian government halted the league until 3 April 2020 due to the COVID-19 pandemic in Italy. Serie C did not resume play on this date. On 18 May, it was announced that Italian football would be suspended until 14 June.

On 8 June, the Italian Football Federation formally declared Monza, Vicenza, and Reggina as champions of their respective groups, thus awarding them promotion to Serie B, while also confirming the promotion and relegations playoff will take place as planned, based on the league standings by the time of the regular season suspension.

Teams 
The league was contested by 60 teams.

Relegated from Serie B 
Padova
Carpi

Venezia was readmitted in Serie B after the bankruptcy of Palermo.

Promoted from Serie D 
Lecco (Girone A winners)
Como (Girone B winners)
Arzignano Valchiampo (Girone C winners)
Pergolettese (Girone D winners)
Pianese (Girone E winners)
Cesena (Girone F winners)
Avellino (Girone G winners)
Picerno (Girone H winners)
Bari (Girone I winners)

Readmissions
Following the disbandment of Arzachena, Lucchese and Siracusa and the failure of Albissola to register for the league, four relegated clubs were readmitted as members of Serie C.
Virtus Verona
Fano
Paganese
Bisceglie

Repechages
Following the bankruptcy of Foggia (relegated from Serie B) and Palermo, FIGC chose two historic big clubs from Serie D to fill the vacancies.
Modena
Reggio Audace

Bisceglie readmission and Audace Cerignola case
On 12 July, the FIGC additionally excluded Arzachena from Serie C, but Bisceglie were not initially readmitted and were awaiting the result of court proceedings, along with Audace Cerignola. As a result, one vacancy remained in Group C that had not been filled, due to a lack of valid applications for Serie C readmissions.

On 23 July, the Court of the CONI overturned the original decision from the FIGC by declaring both Bisceglie and Audace Cerignola's readmission requests as valid, thus creating uncertainty on the new format and even opening doors to a potential 21-team Group C.

On 25 July, the FIGC readmitted Bisceglie to Serie C, whereas, in spite of the ruling by the Court of the CONI, Audace Cerignola's request was rejected due to alleged stadium irregularities. On August 5, however, CONI once again overturned the FIGC's decision not to admit Audace Cerignola to Serie C.

On 10 September, Lazio's Regional Administrative Tribunal denied Audace Cerignola's appeal for readmission, by suspending the measures for which CONI had used to readmit the club into Serie C. A new hearing was set for February 11, 2020, at which time a repecheage would no longer be possible, which effectively left the club in Serie D.

COVID-19 pandemic suspension
On 9 March 2020, the Lega Pro committee announced the suspension of the league due to the COVID-19 pandemic in Italy.

On 8 May 2020, the league committee formally proposed the Italian Football Federation to end the season altogether and award promotion to the three league toppers (Monza, Vicenza and Reggina), plus Carpi for having the highest point-per-game ratio among all other teams by the time of the suspension, and block all relegations to Serie D. This proposal was however rejected by the Italian Football Federation on 20 May, as they objected the Serie C season will have to end as planned, with 20 August as the formal deadline to complete it.

On 8 June, the Italian Football Federation formally declared the end of the Serie C regular season; Monza, Vicenza and Reggina were awarded promotion to Serie B, while Gozzano, Rimini and Rieti were relegated to Serie D. Promotion and relegation playoffs will take place as planned, albeit on a voluntary basis.

Following the deliberation from the Italian Football Federation, Pontedera, Arezzo, Modena, Pro Patria, Piacenza and Vibonese announced they would not take part to the promotion playoffs.

Stadia and locations

Group A (North & Central West) 
8 teams from Lombardy, 6 teams from Tuscany, 5 teams from Piedmont and 1 team from Sardinia.

Group B (North & Central East) 
8 teams from Emilia-Romagna, 4 teams from Marche, 4 teams from Veneto, 1 team from Friuli-Venezia Giulia, 1 team from Lombardy, 1 team from Trentino-Alto Adige and 1 team from Umbria.

Group C (Center & South) 
4 teams from Apulia, 4 teams from Calabria, 4 teams from Campania, 2 teams from Basilicata, 2 teams from Lazio, 2 teams from Sicily, 1 from Abruzzo and 1 from Umbria.

League tables

Group A (North & Central West)

Group B (North & Central East)

Group C (Center & South)

Promotion play-offs

First round 
If tied, higher-placed team advances.

|}

Second round 
If tied, higher-placed team advances.

|}

Third round 
If tied, higher-placed team advances.

|}

Fourth round 
If tied, higher-placed team advances.

|}

Final four 
If tied after regular time, winner is decided by extra-time and eventually penalty shoot-out.

Reggio Audace promoted to Serie B.

Relegation play-outsHigher-placed team plays at home for second leg. If tied on aggregate, lower-placed team is relegated.''

|}

Top goalscorers

Note
1Player scored 1 goal in the play-offs.
2Player scored 2 goals in the play-offs.
3Player scored 3 goals in the play-offs.

Notes

Footnotes

References

External links
 Official website

Serie C seasons
3
Italy
Italy